Daniel Masur and Ante Pavić were the defending champions but chose not to defend their title.

Ben McLachlan and Yasutaka Uchiyama won the title after defeating Jeevan Nedunchezhiyan and Christopher Rungkat 4–6, 6–3, [10–8] in the final.

Seeds

Draw

References
 Main Draw

Kobe Challenger - Doubles
2017 Doubles